Nikos Athanasiou (born 16 March 2001) is a Greek professional footballer who plays as a left-back for Super League club Atromitos.

References

2001 births
Living people
Super League Greece players
Super League Greece 2 players
Atromitos F.C. players
Niki Volos F.C. players
Association football fullbacks
Footballers from Athens
Greek footballers